Scleropodium is a genus of mosses belonging to the family Brachytheciaceae. The genus has an almost cosmopolitan distribution.

Species
The following species are recognised in the genus Scleropodium:
 

Scleropodium ambiguum 
Scleropodium apiculigerum 
Scleropodium aplocladum 
Scleropodium australe 
Scleropodium brachyphyllum 
Scleropodium californicum 
Scleropodium cespitans 
Scleropodium coreense 
Scleropodium giraldii 
Scleropodium julaceum 
Scleropodium krausei 
Scleropodium lentum 
Scleropodium levieri 
Scleropodium obtusifolium 
Scleropodium occidentale 
Scleropodium pseudopurum 
Scleropodium subcaespitosum 
Scleropodium touretii

References

Hypnales
Moss genera